Gilbert Tyuiénon (born 28 March 1958) is a New Caledonian politician. He is a pro-independence ethnic Kanak. Tyuiénon-was elected Vice President of New Caledonia on 11 March 2011 in the collegial cabinet of Harold Martin and held that position until 5 June 2014. As of 2018, he continues to be a member of the collegial government. 

He was reelected as Vice President of New Caledonia on 9 July 2019 in the cabinet of Thierry Santa. He left office on 22 July 2021.

Tyuiénon was elected as mayor of Canala in 2001 as candidate of Caledonian Union.

References

1958 births
Living people
Vice presidents of the Government of New Caledonia
Kanak people
Caledonian Union politicians
Mayors of places in New Caledonia
People from North Province, New Caledonia